Əmircan or Amircan or Amirdzhan may refer to:
Əmircan, Baku, Azerbaijan
Əmircan, Qakh, Azerbaijan